Cosmos is a genus, with the same common name of cosmos, consisting of flowering plants in the sunflower family.

Description
The leaves are simple, pinnate, or bipinnate, and arranged in opposite pairs. The flowers are produced in a capitulum with a ring of broad ray florets and a center of disc florets; flower color varies noticeably between the different species. The genus includes several ornamental plants popular in gardens. Numerous hybrids and cultivars have been selected and named.

Distribution
Cosmos species are native to scrub and meadowland in Mexico where most of the species occur. In the United States, some varieties may be found as far north as the Olympic Peninsula in Washington, but the range also extends through Central America to South America as far south as Paraguay. One species, C. bipinnatus, is naturalized across much of the eastern United States and eastern Canada.

It is also widespread over the high eastern plains of South Africa, where it was introduced via contaminated horsefeed during the Anglo-Boer War.

Species

 Accepted species

Gallery

References

External links

 Germplasm Resources Information Network: Cosmos
 Flora of Bolivia: Cosmos checklist

 
Asteraceae genera
Butterfly food plants
Taxa named by Antonio José Cavanilles